The Grand Prix Albert Fauville-Baulet is a one-day professional cycling race held annually in Belgium since 2017. It has been part of UCI Europe Tour since 2018 in category 1.2. It was known as the Mémorial Albert Fauville in 2016 and 2017.

Winners

References

Cycle races in Belgium
UCI Europe Tour races
Recurring sporting events established in 2016